Life on the Ropes is a studio album from American hardcore punk band Sick of It All. Released in September 2003, it was the band's final album of new material on Fat Wreck Chords until 2018's Wake the Sleeping Dragon! The album features guest backing vocals from, among others, John Joseph of Cro-Mags.

Track listing
All tracks written by Sick of It All
"Relentless" –   2:24
"All My Blessings" –    1:48
"The Land Increases" –   1:38
"Paper Tiger (Fakin' the Punk)" –   2:08
"The Innocent" –   2:51
"Silence" –   2:38
"For Now" –   2:45
"View from the Surface" –   2:32
"Going All Out" –   2:29
"Rewind" –   2:21
"Shit Sandwich (Instra-Mental)" –   1:04
"Butting Heads" –   2:46
"Take Control" –   2:17
"Kept in Check" –   2:42
"On the Brink" –   2:26
"Trenches" –   3:33

Credits
Lou Koller – vocals
Pete Koller – guitar
Craig Setari – bass guitar
Armand Majidi – drums
John Joseph of Cro-Mags – guest vocals on Paper Tiger (Fakin' The Punk)
 Opening line by Robert De Niro sampled from the 1978 movie The Deer Hunter
Recorded at Atomic Recording Company, Brooklyn, New York, US
Produced by Sick of It All and Dean Baltolonis

References

2003 albums
Fat Wreck Chords albums
Sick of It All albums